Kim Jun-tae may refer to:
 Kim Jun Tae (born 1948), South Korean poet
 Kim Jun-tae (born 1985), South Korean footballer
 Kim Joon-tae, South Korean taekwondo practitioner
 Kim Jun Tae (billiards player), South Korean player of three-cushion billiards